The 1941 Saint Louis Billikens football team was an American football team that represented Saint Louis University as a member of the Missouri Valley Conference (MVC) during the 1941 college football season. In its second season under head coach Dukes Duford, the team compiled a 4–5–1 record (1–3–1 against MVC opponents), finished fourth in the conference, and was outscored by a total of 150 to 100. The team played its home games at Walsh Stadium in St. Louis.

Quarterback Dick Weber was selected by the conference coaches as a first-team player on the 1941 All-Missouri Valley Conference football team.

Schedule

References

Saint Louis
Saint Louis Billikens football seasons
Saint Louis Billikens football